David Dick Petrie (10 December 1946 – 31 August 2011) was a Scottish Conservative Party politician. He was a Member of the Scottish Parliament (MSP) from 2006 to 2007, representing the Highlands and Islands region.

Petrie was elected after Mary Scanlon stood down from Holyrood in 2006 to contest the Moray by-election triggered by the death of Margaret Ewing of the SNP. This was the result of Petrie being ranked one place behind Scanlon on the Conservative Party list for the Highlands and Islands. He had previously stood as a candidate for Argyll and Bute. Petrie did not win re-election at the 2007 Scottish Parliament election.

After leaving the Scottish Parliament, Petrie taught as a part-time teacher of Mathematics at Trinity Academy, Edinburgh. He died in August 2011 at the age of 64 after collapsing from a heart attack in front of colleagues.

Civil engineering
Prior to his political career, Petrie had graduated from the University of Edinburgh with a Bachelor of Science (BSc) degree in civil engineering. He worked as a civil engineer with Scottish Water.

References

External links 
 
 Dave Petrie MSP profile at the site of Conservative Party

1946 births
2011 deaths
Conservative MSPs
Members of the Scottish Parliament 2003–2007
Alumni of the University of Edinburgh
People from Oban